Blue Blot were a Belgian blues rock band.

Biography
The band were formed by frontman Luke Walter Jr. and influenced by blues-rock and soul music, with an emphasis on hits. They signed to Ace, a small Belgium label and released their debut album, Shopping For Love in 1987. The group were signed to BMG / Ariola and achieved commercial success in Germany and Scandinavia with the albums Bridge To Your Heart and Where Do We Go and a cover of Toto's "Hold the Line". In 1993, Walter Jr discovered he was suffering from leukemia and left the band to be replaced by Steve Clisby. He later had a solo career but died in 1996.

Members
 Luke Walter Jr. – vocals (to 1993)
 Steve Clisby – vocals (after 1993)
 Marty Townsend – guitar
 Lenny Northover  – sax
 Michael Schack  – drums
 Jan Meijers – bass
Backing vocals:
 Anja Baert alias Chelsy
 Catherine Mys
 Cindy Barg
 Mich Van Hautem
 Sabine de Vos (stand-in)

Discography
 Studio albums
 Shopping For Love (1987)
 Bridge to your Heart (1991)
 Where Do We Go (1992)
 Yo Yo Man (1994)
 Blue Blot (1996)

Live albums
 Live (1993)

Compilations
 Blunk (2000)
 Hit Collection (2008)

References

Belgian blues rock musical groups
Belgian rock music groups
Musical groups established in 1986
Musical groups disestablished in 2000
Ariola Records artists